Christoph von der Malsburg (born 8 May 1942) is a German physicist and neuroscientist.

Early life
von der Malsburg obtained his PhD with a concentration in elementary particle physics at CERN and the University of Heidelberg in 1970.

Career 
He joined the neurobiology department of the Max-Planck-Institute for Biophysical Chemistry in Göttingen. He remained there until 1987, when he became a professor of Computer Science, Neuroscience, Physics and Psychology at the University of Southern California in Los Angeles. In 1990, he founded the Institut für Neuroinformatik (Institute for Neural Computation) at Ruhr-University Bochum, together with Werner von Seelen. He commuted between the two institutions until 2007, when he joined the Frankfurt Institute for Advanced Studies as a Senior Fellow.

Von der Malsburg co-founded two companies and received a number of awards. He is a member of the scientific advisory board of the Human Brain Project and one of the members of the founding board of Mindfire Foundation, of which he also heads the neuroscience board.

Brain Theory
His research interests focused on processes of organization in the brain with emphasis on the structure and function of the visual system. His publications concerning the theory of self-organization of regular fiber projections in the visual system made him a pioneer of this field. He is known for his criticism of the theory of neural networks. He claimed that the generally accepted view fails because of the binding problem. To solve it he formulated the Dynamic Link Architecture, a system of rapidly switching network fragments, as applied to facial recognition.

Recognition 
 Pioneer Award 1994 of the Neural Network Council of the IEEE
 Karl Heinz Beckurts Foundation Award 1998
 Koerber-Award for European Science 2000
 Hebb Award 2003 of the International Neural Network Society
 President of the European Neural Network Society from 1995 to 1996
 Fellow of the International Neural Network Society 
 Co-editor of several journals

References

1942 births
Scientists from Kassel
20th-century German physicists
German neuroscientists
Heidelberg University alumni
University of Southern California faculty
Living people
People associated with CERN